Yang Ailong (born 2 January 1995) is a Chinese footballer who currently plays for Shenyang Urban.

Club career
Yang Ailong went to Portugal for further training following Chinese Football Association 500.com Stars Project in 2011. He played for Casa Pia and Sacavenense between 2011 and 2013. Yang joined Segunda Liga side Atlético CP in the summer of 2014 after settling his contract disputes with former club Changchun Yatai. He transferred back to Campeonato Nacional de Seniores side Sacavenense in November 2014. Yang moved to Torreense in July 2015. On 15 July 2016, Yang was loaned to Chinese Super League side Jiangsu Suning along with Liu Junshuai. He played for Jiangsu Suning's reserve team and returned to Portugal in October 2016. He joined Campeonato de Portugal side Pinhalnovense for the 2016–17 season.

Yang transferred to Chinese Super League side Yanbian Funde on 13 July 2017. He made his debut for Yanbian on 23 July 2017 in a 6–2 away defeat against Guangzhou R&F as the benefit of the new rule of the league that at least one Under-23 player must be in the starting line-up and was substituted off by Sun Jun in the 17th minute. Yang received trial with Guizhou Hengfeng following Yanbian's relegation at the end of 2017 season. However, his former club Changchun Yatai submitted a claim to the Chinese Football Association for his ownership and held back his further transfer.

Yang rejoined S.C.U. Torreense in the summer of 2018.

Career statistics
.

References

External links

1995 births
Living people
Chinese footballers
Footballers from Liaoning
People from Tieling
Atlético Clube de Portugal players
S.C.U. Torreense players
C.D. Pinhalnovense players
Yanbian Funde F.C. players
Liaoning Shenyang Urban F.C. players
Segunda Divisão players
Chinese Super League players
China League One players
Chinese expatriate footballers
Expatriate footballers in Portugal
Chinese expatriate sportspeople in Portugal
Association football midfielders